Herbertiada is an annual cultural festival and competitions dedicated to the memory of Zbigniew Herbert. Established in 2000, it takes place in Kołobrzeg, Poland. Various events and performances are organized, including two days that are devoted to workshops for young poets and recitations.

Notes

External links
 

Poetry festivals in Poland
Festivals in Poland
Recurring events established in 2000